Dolichol monophosphate mannose is a chemical compound involved in glycosylation.

References

 

Organophosphates